Javier Capelli (born January 7, 1985) is an Argentine footballer currently playing for Talleres Remedios in the Primera B Metropolitana as defender.

References
 Profile at BDFA 
 

Living people
Argentine footballers
Argentine expatriate footballers
Primera B Metropolitana players
Primera Nacional players
Primera B de Chile players
Chilean Primera División players
Argentine Primera División players
Rangers de Talca footballers
Club Deportivo Palestino footballers
San Martín de San Juan footballers
Club Atlético Sarmiento footballers
Talleres de Remedios de Escalada footballers
Expatriate footballers in Chile
1984 births
Association football defenders